Geldeston was a station in Geldeston, Norfolk – a station on the Waveney Valley Line. It was opened in the early 1860s, and closed to passengers nearly a century later in 1953. It was the penultimate station on the line, and the last in Norfolk as the line crossed the border into Suffolk before the junction station of Beccles. The station still exists today and can easily be found in Geldeston.

References

External links
 Geldeston station on navigable 1946 O. S. map

Disused railway stations in Norfolk
Former Great Eastern Railway stations
Railway stations in Great Britain opened in 1863
Railway stations in Great Britain closed in 1953